Savage Souls can refer to:

 Savage Souls (album) an album by the band Mystic Prophecy
 Savage Souls (film), a 2001 film directed by Raúl Ruiz